St. John's East (formerly known as St. John's North) is a federal electoral district in Newfoundland and Labrador, Canada, that has been represented in the House of Commons of Canada since 1949.

It covers a part of St. John's. For a brief period in 2003 and 2004, it was known as "St. John's North".

In the 2019 federal election, former NDP MP Jack Harris defeated incumbent MP Nick Whalen in a rematch of the 2015 election. Harris retired in 2021, and Liberal Joanne Thompson won the seat.

Demographics
Ethnic groups: 97.2% White 
Languages: 97.7% English, 1.9% Other 
Religions:  47.1% Catholic, 46.0% Protestant, 4.9% No affiliation 
Average income: $28 969

Geography
The district includes the extreme northeastern part of the Avalon Peninsula including the northern half of the City of St. John's, and the eastern half of the Town of Conception Bay South.  It also includes Bell Island, Little Bell Island and Kelly's Island.

The neighbouring ridings are Avalon and St. John's South—Mount Pearl.

According to Elections Canada, the geographic boundaries for this riding as of the 39th General Election are:

 "All that area consisting of:

(a) the towns of Bauline, Flatrock, Logy Bay-Middle Cove-Outer Cove, Portugal Cove-St. Philip's, Pouch Cove, Torbay and Wabana;

(b) that part of the Town of Paradise lying northeasterly and northerly of a line described as follows: commencing at the intersection of the easterly limit of the Town of Paradise with Topsail Road; thence generally westerly along said road to Paradise Road; thence generally northwesterly along said road to Camrose Drive; thence northerly along said drive to the northerly limit of said town; and

(c) that part of the City of St. John's lying northwesterly of a line described as follows: commencing at the intersection of the westerly limit of the City of St. John's with Kenmount Road coincident with the northerly limit of the City of Mount Pearl; thence northeasterly and easterly along said road and Freshwater Road to Lemarchant Road; thence southerly along said road to Barter's Hill; thence generally southeasterly along Barter's Hill to Waldegrave Street; thence easterly and northeasterly along said street to Water Street; thence northerly and northeasterly along said street to Temperance Street; thence northwesterly along said street to Duckworth Street; thence northeasterly along said street to Signal Hill Road; thence northeasterly along said road to Cabot Avenue; thence northeasterly in a straight line to a point on Signal Hill at approximate latitude 47°34'31"N and longitude 52°41'21"W (on the northern boundary of the Johnson Geo Centre lot); thence due east in a straight line to the Atlantic Ocean."

See the map of the St. John's East riding.

History
The riding was created when Newfoundland joined Confederation in 1949 and has historically been a conservative stronghold. St. John's East was won by Liberal Bonnie Hickey in 1993 election, who was defeated by Progressive Conservative Norman Doyle in the 1997 election. Doyle held the riding for the PCs and then the Conservatives, but stood down in 2008 and was replaced in a landslide by New Democrat, Jack Harris. Harris held the riding until his defeat in the 2015 election by Nick Whalen. That result was considered one of the biggest surprises of the 2015 election.

As of the 2012 electoral redistribution, 21% of this riding will be moved into Avalon, and it will gain 5% from St. John's South—Mount Pearl.

Members of Parliament

This riding has elected the following Members of Parliament:

Election results

St. John's East (2004-present)

2021 general election

2019 general election

2015 general election

2011 general election

2008 general election

2006 general election

St. John's North (2003-2004)

2004 general election

St. John's East (1949-2003)

2000 general election

1997 general election

1993 general election

1988 general election

1987 by-election

1984 general election

1980 general election

1979 general election

1974 general election

1972 general election

1968 general election

1965 general election

1963 general election

1962 general election

1958 general election

1957 general election

1953 general election

1949 general election

Student Vote Results

2019

2015

2011

See also
 List of Canadian federal electoral districts
 Past Canadian electoral districts

References

 St. John's East riding from Elections Canada
 Riding history for St. John's East (1949–1952) from the Library of Parliament
 Riding history for St. John's East (1952–1987) from the Library of Parliament
 Riding history for St. John's East (1987–2003) from the Library of Parliament
 Riding history for St. John's North (2003–2004) from the Library of Parliament
 Riding history for St. John's East (2004– ) from the Library of Parliament
 Election Financial Reports from Elections Canada

Notes

Newfoundland and Labrador federal electoral districts
Politics of St. John's, Newfoundland and Labrador